Eupilio is a comune (municipality) in the Province of Como in the Italian region Lombardy, located about  north of Milan and about  east of Como.

Eupilio borders the following municipalities: Bosisio Parini, Canzo, Cesana Brianza, Erba, Longone al Segrino, Merone, Pusiano, Rogeno.

References

Cities and towns in Lombardy